Murray Arnold Straus (June 18, 1926 – May 13, 2016) was an American professor of sociology at the University of New Hampshire. He is best known for creating the conflict tactics scale, the "most widely used instrument in research on family violence".

Professional life
Straus was born to Samuel and Kathleen Straus in New York City on June 18, 1926.  Straus' research focused on families, corporal punishment, and intimate partner violence with an emphasis on cross-national comparisons. He founded the Family Research Laboratory at the University of New Hampshire.  Straus served as president of the Society for the Study of Social Problems (1989–90) and the Eastern Sociological Society (1991–92). He was also a founding editor of the peer-review academic journals Teaching Sociology and ''Journal of Family Issues.

Personal life
He was married to Dorothy Dunn Straus and had a son and a daughter from a previous marriage.

Achievements and awards
Award for Distinguished Lifetime Contributions to Research on Aggression - 2008
Ernest W. Burgess Award - 1977

References

1926 births
2016 deaths
American sociologists
Domestic violence academics
University of Wisconsin–Madison alumni
University of New Hampshire faculty
Academic journal editors
Academics from New York (state)
People from New York City